The L and L Building is a historic two-story building in Billings, Montana. It was designed in the Italianate style, and built in 1893-1896 by Sam and Yee Quong Lee, two brothers who were born in China and emigrated to the United States in 1865. It housed a dry goods store, a restaurant, and a
lodging house until the late 1910s, when the first floor was remodelled as a saloon and a liquor store. It later housed the Arcade Bar, which became known as "an eyesore and a gathering spot for the city's criminal underbelly," The bar closed temporarily after it was raided by the police, who arrested a bartender and two customers on marijuana charges in January 1993, and it closed down in May 1994. The building was refurbished in 2004–2006. It has been listed on the National Register of Historic Places since December 19, 2008.

References

	
National Register of Historic Places in Yellowstone County, Montana
Italianate architecture in Montana
Commercial buildings completed in 1893
1893 establishments in Montana
Chinese-American culture
Buildings and structures in Billings, Montana